is a railway station in Miyaki, Miyaki District, Saga Prefecture, Japan. It is operated by JR Kyushu and is on the Nagasaki Main Line.

Lines

Station layout 
The station consists of a side and an island platform serving three tracks with a siding branching off track 1. A small station building of concrete construction houses a waiting area, a staffed ticket window and automatic ticket vending machines. Access to the island platform is by means of a footbridge.

Management of the station has been outsourced to the JR Kyushu Tetsudou Eigyou Co., a wholly owned subsidiary of JR Kyushu specialising in station services. It staffs the ticket window which is equipped with a POS machine but does not have a Midori no Madoguchi facility.

Adjacent stations

History
When the Kyushu Railway was nationalized on 1 July 1907, Japanese Government Railways (JGR) took over control of the station. On 12 October 1909, the station became part of the Nagasaki Main Line. The With the privatization of Japanese National Railways (JNR), the successor of JGR, on 1 April 1987, control of the station passed to JR Kyushu.

Passenger statistics
In fiscal 2016, the station was used by an average of 1,072 passengers daily (boarding passengers only), and it ranked 156th among the busiest stations of JR Kyushu.

Environs
The station is in a residential district.
Miyaki Town Nakabaru Government Building
Ayabe Shrine (enshrining the wind god)

References

External links
Nakabaru Station (JR Kyushu)

Nagasaki Main Line
Railway stations in Saga Prefecture
Railway stations in Japan opened in 1891